The London Night Bus network is a series of night bus routes that serve Greater London. Services broadly operate between the hours of 23:00 and 06:00.

Many services commence from or operate via Trafalgar Square and are extensions or variations of daytime routes and hence derive their number from these; for example, route N73 Oxford Circus to Walthamstow follows that of route 73 as far as Stoke Newington, before continuing further north.

History
The first night bus was introduced in 1913. By 1920 there were two 'All Night Bus Services' in operation named the 94 and 94a running from 23:30 to 05:30. A few more services were introduced over the following decades, but all ceased during World War II. Services resumed after the war, increasing as trams and trolleybuses were replaced in the late 1950s and 1960s. In 1978 London Transport listed 21 all-night bus routes. On many of these routes, "all-night" service meant a departure frequency of no more than one bus an hour. In April 1984, the number of routes was increased from 21 to 32. At this point the peak service required 80 buses; by August 2013 this had grown to 890.

Originally the night bus network had its own fare structure, but with the introduction of the Oyster card in 2003, it was incorporated into the Transport for London fare structure. Until the mid-2000s, all routes had N prefixes. However, as some routes merely mirrored their day time equivalents, the N prefixes were dropped and these routes became 24-hour services; for example, route N14 was no longer differentiated from route 14.

Services are operated by private operators under contract to London Buses. The Night Bus contracts are often bundled with those of the equivalent daytime routes and awarded for a five-year period, with an optional two-year extension based on performance standards being met. Some however are tendered individually.

With some London Underground lines operating a 24-hour service at weekends from August 2016, a further eight routes commenced 24-hour operation on Friday and Saturday nights. Further changes were made as the Night Tube network expanded.

In May 2015, the Night Bus network was the subject of The Night Bus, a Channel 4 documentary.

Operation
Night bus routes are often related to the daytime route with the same number, often running the same route but with an extension at one or both ends. The usual purpose of the extension is to provide a night service to destinations served by tube or train during the day.

However, there are a few N-prefixed route numbers that have no relation to the daytime route with the same number: the N5, N20 and N97 all operate in a different part of London from the respective day routes, and the N550 and N551 (which provide night service on parts of the Docklands Light Railway network) have no corresponding daytime routes.

N1
Route N1 commenced operating on 28 June 1995 between Plumstead garage and Trafalgar Square. It was originally operated by London Central, being taken over by First London on 14 November 1998. On 8 January 2000 it was extended beyond Plumstead to Thamesmead, and in April 2000 withdrawn between Trafalgar Square and Aldwych being diverted to Tottenham Court Road station. Upon being re-tendered, the route was taken over by East Thames Buses on 15 October 2005.

In October 2009, East Thames Buses was sold to London General, which included a five-year contract to operate route N1.

Route
Route N1 operates via these primary locations:
Thamesmead
Abbey Wood station  
Plumstead station 
Woolwich Arsenal station  
Charlton station 
Greenwich Cutty Sark station 
Deptford
Surrey Quays station 
South Bermondsey station 
Elephant & Castle station  
Waterloo station  
Aldwych
Holborn station 
Tottenham Court Road station

N2
Route N2 commenced operating on 13 April 1984 between West Norwood station and Trafalgar Square. In October 1984, it was extended north from Trafalgar Square to Friern Barnet and south from West Norwood station to Crystal Palace. In June 1995, it was withdrawn between Camden Town and Friern Barnet, and rerouted to Hampstead Heath. In November 1999, the Trafalgar Square to Hampstead Heath section was withdrawn and replaced by route N24. Upon being re-tendered, it passed from Metroline to Arriva London in April 2000.

Route
Route N2 operates via these primary locations:
Crystal Palace
West Norwood station 
Tulse Hill station 
Brixton station 
Stockwell station 
Vauxhall bus station  
Pimlico station 
London Victoria station  
Hyde Park Corner station 
Marble Arch
Marylebone station

N3
Route N3 began operating on 27 October 1989 between Beckenham Junction station and Victoria bus station via Oxford Circus. In October 1993, it was extended to start back at Chislehurst. In May 2000, it was altered to operate between Bromley North station and Oxford Circus. Its operation passed from London Central to Connex on the same date.

Route N3 was included in the sale of Connex to Travel London in February 2004 which in turn was sold to Abellio London in May 2009. New Routemasters commenced operating route N3 on 8 February 2016.

Route
Route N3 operates via these primary locations:
Bromley North station 
Bromley South station 
Beckenham War Memorial 
Clock House station 
Beckenham Road Tramlink 
Kent House station 
Penge Pawleyne Arms 
Anerley station  
Crystal Palace station  
Herne Hill station 
Brixton station  
Kennington
Lambeth Palace
Westminster station 
Trafalgar Square
Piccadilly Circus station 
Oxford Circus station

N5
Route N5 commenced operating on 28 October 1989 between Edgware station and Victoria bus station. In June 1995, it was withdrawn between Trafalgar Square and Victoria. It was operated by Metroline since its inception until July 2020 when it passed to London Sovereign.

Route
Route N5 operates via these primary locations:
Edgware bus station 
Burnt Oak station 
Colindale station 
Hendon station 
Hendon Central station 
Golders Green station 
Hampstead station 
Belsize Park station 
Chalk Farm station 
Camden Town station 
Euston bus station   
Leicester Square station 
Trafalgar Square

N7
Route N7 commenced operating on 30 August 2003 between Northolt and Russell Square partly replacing route N23. It was initially operated by First London. Upon being re-tendered it passed to Metroline on 23 June 2007 who commenced a further contract on 21 June 2014. In October 2014 it was withdrawn between Oxford Circus station and Russell Square.

Route
Route N7 operates via these primary locations:
Northolt station 
Yeading, White Hart
Greenford Broadway
Ealing Broadway station  
Ealing Common station 
Acton Central station  
East Acton station 
Hammersmith Hospital
Ladbroke Grove station 
Westbourne Grove
Paddington station   
Marble Arch station 
Oxford Circus station

N8
Route N8 commenced operating on 13 August 1988 between Bow Church and Queensbury station. In July 1992, the Marble Arch to Queensbury section was withdrawn, with the route redirected to Victoria bus station. In July 1995, it was altered to operate from Woodford Wells to Trafalgar Square. In June 1999, it once again began operating to Victoria, albeit via Piccadilly Circus. This was altered in April 2000 with it now routed via Berkeley Square. In June 2004, its eastern terminus was altered to Hainault. In June 2009, it was again withdrawn between Oxford Circus and Victoria being replaced by route C2.

Route N8 has been operated by East London since its inception. On 28 June 2014, a further contract commenced with New Routemasters.

Route
Route N8 operates via these primary locations:
Hainault
Hainault station 
Barkingside
Gants Hill station 
Redbridge station 
Wanstead station 
Leytonstone bus station
Leytonstone High Road station 
Maryland station 
Stratford bus station     
Old Ford
Bethnal Green station 
Shoreditch High Street station 
Liverpool Street station    
Bank station  
St Paul's station 
City Thameslink station 
Chancery Lane station 
Holborn station 
Tottenham Court Road station  
Oxford Circus station

N9
Route N9 commenced operating on 25 February 1994 between Kingston and Trafalgar Square replacing parts of routes N65 and N97. In March 1997 it was extended from Trafalgar Square to Aldwych. On 29 September 2001, the Hammersmith bus station to Kingston section was withdrawn and the route diverted to Heathrow Central bus station, as well as the new Heathrow Terminal 5 from 2008. Route N9 has been operated by London United since its inception.

Route
Route N9 operates via these primary locations:
Heathrow Terminal 5   
Heathrow Central bus station   
Hounslow West station 
West Thames College
Isleworth station 
Brentford
Kew Bridge station 
Turnham Green
Hammersmith bus station 
High Street Kensington station 
Knightsbridge station 
Green Park station 
Trafalgar Square
Charing Cross station  
Aldwych

N10
Route N10 commenced operating on 29 September 2001 between Richmond and Archway station replacing route N9 between Richmond and Hammersmith bus station. Initially operated by London United on 3 September 2004, the route passed to First London. At the same time, the route was withdrawn between Kings Cross and Archway, being replaced by route N390. On 29 January 2010 route N10 was withdrawn and replaced by routes 10 and 33.

Route
Route N10 operated via these primary locations:
Richmond
Kew Bridge station 
Turnham Green
Hammersmith bus station 
High Street Kensington station 
Hyde Park corner station 
Marble Arch station 
Tottenham Court Road station  
Euston bus station   
Kings Cross

N11
Route N11 commenced operating on 13 April 1984 between Shepherd's Bush Green and Liverpool Street station. In April 1985 it was extended at both ends, westward to Acton Town and east to Hackney Central. It was extended east again in November 1985 to Hackney Wick. In August 1986 it was diverted at the western end from Shepherds Bush to Turnham Green, this was reversed in February 1994.

Having been replaced between Trafalgar Square and Hackney Wick in October 1989 by route N6, it resumed operating to Liverpool Street in February 1994. In March 2001 it was diverted at Hammersmith to Wembley Stadium. Having been operated by London United since its inception, on 29 June 2003 it was taken over by London General. On 7 June 2008, route N11 was diverted at West Ealing to Ealing Broadway being replaced by route 297.

On 23 November 2022, it was announced that route N11 would be rerouted to run to Trafalgar Square instead of Liverpool Street, following a consultation that proposed that it would be replaced with the N26 and a new route, N507. This change will be implemented by the end of 2023.

Route
Route N11 operates via these primary locations:
Ealing Broadway station  
Northfields station 
Acton Town station 
Turnham Green station 
Hammersmith bus station 
Charing Cross Hospital
Fulham Broadway station 
Sloane Square station 
Victoria station  
Westminster station 
Trafalgar Square
Charing Cross station  
City Thameslink station 
Mansion House station 
Bank station  
Liverpool Street bus station

N13
Route N13 commenced operating on 13 April 1984 between North Finchley and Trafalgar Square, being extended on 27 October 1984 from North Finchley to Chipping Barnet and on 8 July 1992 from Trafalgar Square to Victoria bus station, the latter being reversed on 23 June 1995. Upon being re-tendered, on 1 September 2001, the route passed from Metroline to London Sovereign being extended from Trafalgar Square to Aldwych on the same day. It ceased on 1 April 2017 when route 13 was converted to 24-hour operation.

Route
Route N13 operated via these primary locations:
North Finchley bus station
Finchley Central station 
Golders Green station  
Finchley Road & Frognal station 
Finchley Road station 
Swiss Cottage station 
St John's Wood station 
Baker Street station 
Oxford Circus station 
Piccadilly Circus station 
Aldwych

N15

Route N15 commenced operating on 15 July 1995 between Becontree Heath and Paddington station to replace a section of withdrawn route N95 between Becontree Heath and Aldgate. In August 1998 the route was extended from Becontree Heath to Romford Market and withdrawn between Marble Arch and Paddington. The latter was reverted in May 2001. In October 2007 the route was extended from Paddington to Paddington Basin. In August 2010 the route was withdrawn between Regent Street and Paddington Basin, this section replaced by route 159. In May 2013 the route was withdrawn between Trafalgar Square and Regent Street.

Having been operated by East London since its inception, it was taken over by Blue Triangle on 26 August 2017.

Route
Route N15 operates via these primary locations:
Romford Market
Romford station   
Becontree Heath bus station
Barking station   
Canning Town bus station  
Limehouse station  
Aldgate East station 
Aldgate station 
Monument station 
Cannon Street station  
Mansion House station 
St Paul's Cathedral
City Thameslink station 
Charing Cross station  
Trafalgar Square
Piccadilly Circus station 
Oxford Circus station

N16
Route N16 commenced operating on 19 January 1991 between Edgware bus station and Victoria bus station via Trafalgar Square. In October 2002 it was rerouted away from Trafalgar Square to run direct from Marble Arch via Park Lane to Victoria. It has been operated by Metroline since the start of service.

On 23 November 2022, it was announced that route N16 would be renumbered as N32 following a consultation that suggested it would be withdrawn, with links being retained by the proposed new route N32 between Edgware and Oxford Circus. This change will be implemented by the end of 2023.

Route
Route N16 operates via these primary locations:
Edgware bus station 
Burnt Oak
Colindale
West Hendon
Staples Corner
Cricklewood bus garage
Kilburn station 
Brondesbury station 
Kilburn High Road station 
Maida Vale station 
Edgware Road station 
Marble Arch station 
Hyde Park Corner station 
Victoria bus station

N18
Route N18 commenced operating on 13 April 1984 between Sudbury and Liverpool Street station. In April 1985 it was extended from Sudbury to Harrow Weald via Edgware at its outer end and curtailed from Liverpool Street to Aldwych at its inner end. Having been operated by First London since privatisation, it was included in the sale of Willesden Junction garage to Metroline in June 2013. In November 2017 operation of the route passed to London United.

Route
Route N18 operates via these primary locations:
Harrow Weald bus garage
Harrow & Wealdstone station   
Harrow-on-the-Hill station  
Northwick Park Hospital
Sudbury & Harrow Road station 
Wembley Central station   
Stonebridge Park station  
Harlesden Jubilee Clock
Kensal Green station  
Royal Oak station 
Edgware Road station 
Baker Street station 
Great Portland Street station 
Oxford Circus station 
Piccadilly Circus station 
Trafalgar Square

N19
Route N19 commenced operating on 28 October 1989 between Clapham Junction station and Finsbury Park station. London General operated it until April 2000 when it was taken over by Arriva London. London General won the route back when re-tendered from March 2012, before it returned to Arriva operation in April 2017.

Route
Route N19 operates via these primary locations:
Clapham Junction station 
Battersea Bridge
Sloane Square station 
Hyde Park Corner station 
Green Park station 
Piccadilly Circus station 
Tottenham Court Road station  
Clerkenwell Road
Angel station 
Highbury & Islington station  
Finsbury Park bus station

N20
Route N20 commenced operating on 28 October 1989 from Chipping Barnet to Aldwych as route N1. It was curtailed from Aldwych to Trafalgar Square on 18 July 1992. It was renumbered as N20 on 24 June 1995. First London operated it from 15 July 1998 until it returned to Metroline on 25 August 2003.

Route
Route N20 operates via these primary locations:
Barnet Hospital
Chipping Barnet
High Barnet station 
Finchley Central station 
East Finchley station 
Highgate station 
Archway station 
Tufnell Park station 
Kentish Town station  
Camden Town station 
Euston bus station   
Tottenham Court Road station  
Trafalgar Square

N21
Night Bus Route N21 is the night service for route 21 between Bank and Lewisham, and – until 10 October 2009 – for route 233 between Eltham and Foots Cray, for route 51 between Blackfen and Foots Cray and for route 321 between New Cross Gate and Eltham and Sidcup (police station) and Foots Cray.

The N21 was introduced to provide a night service over the original route 21 between Central London and Sidcup (Foots Cray), but with a deviation via Avery Hill and Blackfen, to serve the University of Greenwich, which provides the route with steady patronage between there and Central London throughout the week. It originally operated from Victoria to Foots Cray on its current route, but on Friday and Saturday nights some journeys ran via New Eltham and Mottingham, terminating at Sidcup. In 1999 the route was restructured again: the extra weekend journeys via New Eltham were revised to operate from Eltham to Chislehurst via Mottingham and was extended to run every night (not just at weekends). The original service to Foots Cray via Blackfen and Sidcup remained unchanged. Changes to the frequency meant buses running every 30 minutes between Victoria and Eltham then every 60 minutes to Chislehurst and Foots Cray respectively.

In 2002, the Chislehurst journeys were withdrawn and run through to Foots Cray instead, providing a 30-minute service over the whole route. The route was also shortened to start and terminate at Trafalgar Square as opposed to Victoria. On Friday and Saturday nights, demand was such that extras were introduced between Eltham High Street and Trafalgar Square, combined with the Foots Cray buses providing a 15-minute service over that section of route. With the withdrawal of the Chislehurst services, Mottingham and Chislehurst were without a night bus route until February 2008 when the N136 was introduced (replacing parts of the N36).

The route was further amended on 10 October 2009, and withdrawn between Blackfen and Sidcup, instead running to Bexleyheath via Blendon, Bridgen and Old Bexley along the established day route 132. The night service to Sidcup was simultaneously replaced by a 24-hour service on route 321, restoring a night service to New Eltham after an absence of 10 years. On 27 May 2017, the route was transferred to London Central.

Route
Route N21 operates via these primary locations:
Bexleyheath
Bexley station 
Blackfen
Eltham High Street
Lee Green
Lewisham station  
New Cross Gate station  
Old Kent Road
Bricklayers Arms
London Bridge station  
Monument station 
City Thameslink station 
Trafalgar Square

N22
Route N22 commenced operating on 24 November 2000 between Richmond and Piccadilly Circus replace the withdrawn section of route N9 between Richmond and Putney Bridge. On 29 September 2001, the route was extended from Richmond to Kingston. On 3 June 2006, it was withdrawn curtailed from Kingston to Fulwell. It has always been operated by London General. On 16 July 2017, the route was withdrawn between Green Park and Piccadilly Circus and diverted to Oxford Circus via Berkeley Square, partly replacing route C2.

Route
Route N22 operates via these primary locations:
Fulwell Stanley Road
Twickenham
Richmond Bridge
Richmond station   
Mortlake
Barnes Bridge station 
Putney Common
Putney Bridge station 
Chelsea
Sloane Square station 
Knightsbridge station 
Knightsbridge
Hyde Park Corner station 
Piccadilly
Green Park station 
Berkeley Square
Oxford Circus

N25
Route N25 commenced operation on 15 July 1995 between Romford station and Trafalgar Square. Initially operated by East London, upon being re-tendered it passed to First London on 26 July 1999. It ceased On 26 June 2004, when route 25 was converted to 24-hour operation. Route N25 was reintroduced on 1 December 2018 when route 25 ceased to be a 24-hour route with Tower Transit operating it. Upon being re-tendered, it was taken over by East London on 23 May 2020.

Route
Route N25 operates via these primary locations:
Ilford
Little Ilford
Manor Park
Woodgrange Park station 
Forest Gate
Stratford bus station     
Bow Church station 
Bow Road station 
Mile End station 
Stepney Green station 
Whitechapel station  
Aldgate East station 
Aldgate station 
Bank station 
St Paul's station 
City Thameslink station 
Holborn Circus
Chancery Lane station 
Holborn station 
Tottenham Court Road station  
Oxford Circus station

N26
Route N26 commenced operation on 18 July 1992 between Walthamstow Central station and Victoria bus station. It was introduced to replace the withdrawn sections of route N6 between Trafalgar Square and Walthamstow. In 1995 it was curtailed from Victoria to Trafalgar Square but extended at the other end to Walthamstow Fulbourne Road. In 2001 it was rerouted from Walthamstow Central to Chingford station, instead of Fulbourne Road, partly replacing route N38.

On 23 November 2022, it was announced that a proposed extension of route N26 to Victoria, in line with a revised (daytime) route 26, would be going ahead following a consultation; it will be implemented by the end of 2023.

Route
Route N26 operates via these primary locations:
Chingford station 
Chingford Mount
Walthamstow bus station  
Leyton Midland Road station 
Hackney Wick
Hackney Central
Cambridge Heath station 
Shoreditch High Street
Liverpool Street station    
Bank station  
Mansion House station 
St Paul's Cathedral
City Thameslink station 
Trafalgar Square

N27
Route N27 was introduced on 3 February 2001 between Turnham Green and Camden Town. It was operated by First London. It ceased on 19 March 2004 when route 27 was converted to 24-hour operation. It resumed on 9 March 2019 when route 27 ceased to be a 24-hour route, this time being operated by London United. On 9 November 2019, it was taken over by Abellio London.

Route
Route N27 operates via these primary locations:
Hammersmith bus station 
Kensington (Olympia) station   
High Street Kensington station 
Notting Hill Gate station 
Paddington station   
Baker Street station 
Regent's Park station 
Great Portland Street 
Warren Street station 
Mornington Crescent station 
Camden Town station 
Camden Town Camden Market

N28
Route N28 commenced operating on 29 May 1999 between Camden Town and Wandsworth.

Route
Route N28 operates via these primary locations:
Camden Town
Mornington Crescent station 
Camden Town station 
Chalk Farm station 
Swiss Cottage station 
South Hampstead station 
Kilburn High Road station 
Kilburn Park station 
Westbourne Park station 
Notting Hill Gate station 
High Street Kensington station 
Kensington Olympia station   
West Kensington station 
Fulham Broadway station 
Wandsworth Bridge
Wandsworth Town station 
Southside Wandsworth

N29
Route N29 commenced operating on 27 February 1980 between Enfield Town and Trafalgar Square. On 14 January 2006 it was curtailed from Enfield Town to Ponders End with Mercedes-Benz O530G articulated buses introduced. On 26 November 2011 it was converted back to double deck operation.

Route
Route N29 operates via these primary locations:
Enfield Town
Winchmore Hill
Palmers Green
Wood Green station 
Turnpike Lane station 
Harringay Green Lanes station 
Manor House station 
Finsbury Park station  
Camden Road station 
Camden Town station 
Warren Street station 
Tottenham Court Road station  
Trafalgar Square

N31
Route N31 commenced operation on 11 November 1989 between Camden Town and Notting Hill Gate. It initially operated on Friday and Saturday nights only until it became a seven days a week service on 18 July 1992 with the Alexander bodied Mercedes-Benz 811Ds were replaced by Wright Handybus bodied Dennis Darts that in turn were replaced by Marshall Capital bodied Dennis Darts in 1999.

On 29 May 1999, the route was diverted to terminate at Clapham Junction station. It was converted back to double decker operation in June 2004 with Wright Eclipse Gemini bodied Volvo B7TLs. It was included in the June 2013 sale of First London's Westbourne Park to Tower Transit. Upon being re-tendered, on 28 April 2018 the route passed to Metroline.

Route
Route N31 operates via these primary locations:
Camden Town
Chalk Farm station 
Swiss Cottage station 
South Hampstead station 
Kilburn High Road station 
Kilburn Park station 
Westbourne Park station 
Notting Hill Gate station 
High Street Kensington station 
Earl's Court station 
Battersea
Clapham Junction station

N33
Route N33 commenced operating on 18 May 2019 between Fulwell station and Hammersmith bus station with the curtailment of route 33 due to the closure of Hammersmith Bridge.

Route
Route N33 operates via these primary locations:
Fulwell station 
Teddington
North Sheen
Barnes station 
Putney Bridge
Charing Cross Hospital
Hammersmith bus station

N35
Route N35 commenced on 26 April 1997 between Clapham Junction station and Trafalgar Square. In April 2000, the route was withdrawn between Holborn and Trafalgar Square and diverted to Tottenham Court Road station. Having been operated by London Central since its inception, upon being re-tendered in 2009 it was taken over by Travel London. It was included in the May 2009 sale of Travel London to Abellio London. It ceased on 30 April 2016 when route 35 was converted to 24-hour operation.

Route
Route N35 operates via these primary locations:
Clapham Junction station  
Brixton 
Loughborough Junction station 
Camberwell
Elephant & Castle station  
London Bridge station  
Bank station  
Liverpool Street station    
Old Street station  
Clerkenwell
Tottenham Court Road station

N38
Route N38 commenced operating on 14 July 1995 as a half hourly service between Trafalgar Square and Chingford Mount with hourly bifurcation to Chingford station and Chingford Hatch, replacing most of Route N96. Initially operated by East London, upon being tendered it passed to Arriva London from 19 April 1997, being diverted to Victoria bus station on the same date. On 28 April 2001, the route was curtailed from Chingford to Walthamstow.

Route
Route N38 operates via these primary locations:
Walthamstow bus station  
Bakers Arms
Lea Bridge railway station 
Clapton Pond
Hackney Central station 
Hackney Downs station  
Dalston Junction station 
Essex Road station 
Angel station 
Tottenham Court Road station  
Green Park station 
Hyde Park Corner station 
Victoria bus station

N41
Route N41 commenced operation on 9 December 2000 between Tottenham Hale bus station and Archway. On 5 February 2005 it extended from Archway to Trafalgar Square. It has always been operated by Arriva London.

Route
Route N41 operates via these primary locations:
Tottenham Hale bus station  
Seven Sisters station   
Turnpike Lane station 
Hornsey station 
Crouch End Broadway
Hornsey Rise
Archway station 
Upper Holloway station 
Holloway Road station 
Highbury & Islington station  
Angel station 
Leicester Square station 
Trafalgar Square

N44
Route N44 commenced operating on 18 August 1995 between Sutton station and Trafalgar Square. On 26 April 1996 it was extended to Aldwych. It has always been operated by London General.

Route N44 operates via these primary locations:
Route
Sutton station 
Mitcham tram stop  
Tooting station 
Tooting Broadway station 
Earlsfield station 
Wandsworth Town station 
Battersea Park station 
Victoria Coach Station
Victoria station  
Parliament Square
Trafalgar Square
Charing Cross station  
Aldwych

N53
Route N53 commenced operating on 27 October 1989 between Erith and Victoria bus station. On 28 July 1995 the route was extended at either end to Thamesmead and Oxford Circus. On 8 January 2000 the Thamesmead to Plumstead section was withdrawn. On 28 June 2002, the route was withdrawn between Plumstead and Erith. On 15 February 2003 it was withdrawn between Trafalgar Square and Oxford Circus. It ceased on 20 March 2004 when route 53 was converted to a 24-hour service. It was reinstated on 15 June 2019 when route 53 ceased to be a 24-hour service.

Route N53 operates via these primary locations:
Route
Plumstead station 
Plumstead Common
Woolwich Arsenal station  
Charlton
Blackheath
Deptford Bridge station 
New Cross station  
New Cross Gate station  
Old Kent Road
Elephant & Castle station  
Lambeth North station 
Westminster station 
Horse Guards Parade

N55
Route N55 commenced operating on 28 April 2001 between Whipps Cross and Oxford Circus station. On 25 June 2004 it was extended from Whipps Cross to Woodford Wells. It has always been operated by East London.

Route N55 operates via these primary locations:
Route
Woodford Wells
South Woodford station 
Snaresbrook
Wanstead station 
Whipps Cross
Bakers Arms
Lea Bridge Station 
Clapton station 
Hackney Downs station  
Hackney Central station 
Cambridge Heath station 
Old Street station  
Tottenham Court Road station  
Oxford Circus station

N63
Route N63 commenced operating on 16 November 2002 between Crystal Palace and King's Cross station. It is operated by Abellio London.

Route N63 operates via these primary locations:
Route
Crystal Palace
Honor Oak
Peckham Rye station  
Peckham
Old Kent Road
Bricklayers Arms
Elephant & Castle station  
Southwark station 
Blackfriars station  
Ludgate Circus
City Thameslink station 
Farringdon station  
King's Cross station

N65
Route N65 commenced operating on 31 August 2002 between Kingston and Ealing Broadway station. It ceased on 24 January 2004 when route 65 was converted to 24-hour operation. It was reintroduced on 25 October 2018 between Chessington World of Adventures and Ealing Broadway.

Route N65 operates via these primary locations:
Current route
Chessington World of Adventures
Chessington South station 
Chessington North station 
Surbiton station 
Kingston Station 
Ham Common
Richmond station   
Kew Bridge station 
Brentford
South Ealing station 
Ealing Broadway station

N68
Route N68 commenced operating on 27 March 1999 between Purley Cross and Trafalgar Square. On 28 April 2000, the route was diverted at Aldwych via Kingsway, and High Holborn to Tottenham Court Road station and extended from Purley to Old Coulsdon. Having been operated by Arriva London from its inception, on 31 March 2006 it was taken over by London Central and on 31 March 2018 by Abellio London.

Route N68 operates via these primary locations:
Route
Old Coulsdon
Coulsdon South station 
Coulsdon Town station 
Reedham station 
Purley
South Croydon
East Croydon station  
Wellesley Road Tramlink 
Thornton Heath High Street
Selhurst Park
Upper Norwood
West Norwood station 
Tulse Hill station 
Herne Hill station 
Denmark Hill 
King's College Hospital
Camberwell Green
Elephant & Castle station  
Waterloo station  
Aldwych
Holborn station 
Tottenham Court Road station

N72
Route N72 commenced operating on 5 September 1999 between East Acton and Roehampton. It ceased on 24 April 2004 when route 72 was converted to 24-hour operation. With the closure of Hammersmith Bridge, it was reintroduced on 18 May 2019.

Route N72 operates via these primary locations:
Route
East Acton
East Acton station 
White City station 
Shepherd's Bush Green station 
Hammersmith bus station 
Charing Cross Hospital
Putney Bridge
Barnes station 
Roehampton

N73
Route N73 commenced operating on 22 September 1989 between Walthamstow Central station and Victoria bus station. On 17 June 2017, it was cutback from Victoria to Oxford Circus being replaced by route 390.

Route N73 operates via these primary locations:
Route
Walthamstow bus station  
Blackhorse Road station  
Tottenham Hale station  
Seven Sisters station   
South Tottenham station 
Stamford Hill
Stoke Newington station 
Essex Road station 
Angel station 
King's Cross station  
St Pancras station   
Euston bus station   
Euston Square station 
Tottenham Court Road station  
Oxford Circus station

N74
Route N74 commenced operating on 23 November 2002 between Roehampton and Baker Street station.

Route N74 operates via these primary locations:
Route
Roehampton
Putney station 
Charing Cross Hospital
West Brompton station   
South Kensington station 
Knightsbridge station 
Hyde Park Corner station 
Marble Arch station 
Baker Street station

N83
Route N83 commenced operating on 13 September 2002 between Ealing Hospital and Golders Green station. Operated by First London, it ceased on 16 April 2004 when route 83 became a 24-hour service.

It was reintroduced on 13 September 2016 when route 83] was curtailed to only operate between Alperton and Golders Green stations and route 483 introduced between Ealing Hospital and Harrow bus station.

Route
Route N83 operates via these primary locations:
Ealing Hospital
Ealing Broadway station   
North Ealing station 
Hanger Lane station 
Alperton station 
Wembley Central station   
Wembley Stadium station 
West Hendon
Hendon station 
Hendon Central station  
Golders Green station

N86
Route N86 commenced operating on 26 June 2004 between Harold Hill and Stratford bus station replacing the withdrawn section of route N25 between Harold Hill and Ilford.

Route N86 operates via these primary locations:
Route
Harold Hill
Gallows Corner
Romford station   
Chadwell Heath
Seven Kings station 
Ilford
Manor Park
Woodgrange Park station 
Forest Gate
Stratford Broadway
Stratford bus station

N87
Route N77 commenced on 18 August 1995 between Tolworth and Trafalgar Square. On 3 June 2006 route N77 was renumbered N87 and curtailed between Tolworth and Kingston.

Route N87 operates via these primary locations:
Route
Kingston
New Malden
Raynes Park station 
Wimbledon station   
Southfields
Wandsworth
Clapham Junction station   
Nine Elms station 
Vauxhall bus station  
Westminster station 
Charing Cross station  
Aldwych

N89
Route N89 commenced operating on 28 June 2002 between Erith and Trafalgar Square.

Route N89 operates via these primary locations:
Route
Erith
Slade Green station 
Barnehurst station 
Bexleyheath
Welling station 
Shooter's Hill
Blackheath station 
Lewisham
Deptford Bridge station 
New Cross station  
New Cross Gate station  
Queens Road Peckham station 
Camberwell Green
Elephant & Castle station  
Southwark station 
Blackfriars station  
Aldwych
Trafalgar Square

N91
Route N91 commenced operating on 25 February 1994 between Hornsey Rise and Trafalgar Square. On 23 June 1995, the route was extended from Hornsey Rise to Potters Bar. Having been operated by MTL London since its inception, when re-tendered it passed to Capital Citibus on 31 January 1997. It passed with the Capital Citibus to First London in July 1998. When next tendered, it was awarded to Metroline from 6 February 2009.

Route N91 operates via these primary locations:
Route
Cockfosters station 
Oakwood station 
Southgate station 
Arnos Grove station 
New Southgate station 
Bounds Green station 
Wood Green station 
Turnpike Lane station 
Caledonian Road station  
Caledonian Road & Barnsbury station 
King's Cross station  
Euston bus station   
Russell Square station 
Holborn station 
Charing Cross station  
Trafalgar Square

N97
The route is primarily used as a night replacement for the Piccadilly line between Piccadilly Circus and Hammersmith stations. Passengers can then continue their journey using night routes N91 (to Cockfosters) or N9 (to Heathrow). There is currently no night service for the Uxbridge branch. Operation of the route passed from London United to Tower Transit on 5 March 2016.

Route
Route N97 operates via these primary locations:
Hammersmith bus station 
West Brompton station   
Earl's Court station 
South Kensington station 
Knightsbridge station 
Hyde Park Corner station 
Piccadilly Circus station 
Trafalgar Square

N98
Route N98 commenced operating on 19 August 1995 between Stanmore station and Trafalgar Square. On 29 April 2000 the route was diverted at Oxford Circus to Red Lion Square. Initially operated by CentreWest, since 3 February 2001 it has been operated by Metroline.

Route N98 operates via these primary locations:
Route
Stanmore station 
Queensbury station 
Kingsbury station 
Neasden
Willesden Bus Garage
Kilburn High Road station 
Maida Vale station 
Edgware Road station 
Marble Arch station 
Oxford Circus station 
Tottenham Court Road station  
Red Lion Square

N109
Route 109 commenced operating on 11 March 1994 between Coulsdon and Aldwych. It was withdrawn on 17 September 1999, being replaced by route N159. It was reintroduced on 28 August 2010 between Croydon and Oxford Circus station replacing route N159. Initially operated by Arriva London, upon being re-tendered it was taken over by Abellio London on 31 January 2015.

Route N109 operates via these primary locations:
Route
Croydon Katharine Street
West Croydon bus station   
Norbury station 
Streatham station 
Streatham Hill station 
Brixton station 
Kennington
Lambeth North station 
Westminster station 
Trafalgar Square
Piccadilly Circus station 
Oxford Circus station

N113
Route N113 commenced operating on 30 June 2012 between Edgware bus station and Trafalgar Square partly replacing route N13.

Route
Route N113 operates via these primary locations:
Edgware bus station 
Mill Hill Circus
Watford Way
Hendon Central station 
Finchley Road & Frognal station 
Finchley Road station 
Swiss Cottage station 
St John's Wood station 
Baker Street station 
Oxford Circus station 
Piccadilly Circus station 
Trafalgar Square

N133
Route N133 commenced operation on 24 January 2003 between Tooting and Liverpool Street bus station. On 1 September 2007 it was diverted at Streatham to Mitcham. Having been operated by London General since its inception, upon being re-tendered it was taken over by Arriva London on 22 January 2010.

Route N133 operates via these primary locations:
Route
Morden station 
Mitcham tram stop 
Streatham Common station 
Streatham station 
Streatham Hill station 
Brixton station 
Kennington station 
Elephant & Castle station  
Borough station 
London Bridge station  
Monument station 
Bank station  
Moorgate station  
Liverpool Street bus station

N136
Route N136 commenced operating on 9 February 2008 between Chislehurst and Oxford Circus station replacing route N36 between Grove Park and Oxford Circus. Having been operated by Selkent since its inception, upon being re-tendered it was taken over by London Central on 27 May 2017.

Route N136 operates via these primary locations:
Route
Chislehurst
Grove Park station 
Catford Garage
Lewisham station  
New Cross Gate station  
Queens Road Peckham station 
Camberwell Green
Oval station 
Vauxhall bus station  
Victoria station  
Westminster station 
Piccadilly Circus station 
Oxford Circus station

N137
Route N137 commenced operating on 16 March 2001 between Crystal Palace and Oxford Circus station. Having been operated by London Central since its inception, upon being re-tendered it was taken over by Arriva London on 9 July 2004.

Route N137 operates via these primary locations:
Route
Crystal Palace
Streatham Hill station  
Clapham Common station 
Queenstown Road station 
Battersea Park station  
Sloane Square station 
Knightsbridge station 
Hyde Park Corner station 
Marble Arch station 
Bond Street station  
Oxford Circus station

N155
Route N155 commenced operating on 18 August 1995 between Sutton station and Trafalgar Square. On 28 May 1999, the route was extended from Trafalgar Square to Aldwych. On 12 December 2003, it was withdrawn between Sutton and Morden, being replaced by route N44. It has been operated by London General since its inception.

Route N155 operates via these primary locations:
Route
Morden station 
Morden Road tram stop 
South Wimbledon station 
Colliers Wood station 
Tooting Broadway station 
Tooting Bec station 
Balham station  
Clapham South station 
Clapham Common station 
Clapham High Street station 
Clapham North station 
Stockwell station 
Oval station 
Kennington station 
Elephant & Castle station  
Lambeth North station 
Westminster station 
Trafalgar Square
Charing Cross station  
Aldwych

N171
Route N171 commenced operating on 27 April 1996 between Hither Green station and Trafalgar Square. In 2000 it route was diverted at Aldwych to Tottenham Court Road station instead of Trafalgar Square. In 2006, the route was changed to terminate at Catford Bus Garage instead of Hither Green, and so mirror the day 171 route.

On 30 April 2011 it was rerouted to back Hither Green station. Since it inception, it has been operated by London Central.

Route
Route N171 operates via these primary locations:
Hither Green station 
Catford Bridge station 
Catford station 
Crofton Park station 
New Cross station  
New Cross Gate station  
Queens Road Peckham station 
Elephant & Castle station  
Waterloo station  
Aldwych
Holborn station 
Tottenham Court Road station

N199
Route N199 commenced operating on 12 September 2015 between St Mary Cray station and Trafalgar Square to replace discontinued night bus N47.

Route
Route N199 operates via these primary locations:
St Mary Cray station 
Orpington station 
Petts Wood station 
Bromley Common
Bromley South station 
Downham
Catford
Ladywell
Lewisham station  
Greenwich station  
Deptford
Surrey Quays station 
Canada Water station  
Bermondsey station 
London Bridge station  
Monument station 
Cannon Street station  
Mansion House station 
City Thameslink station 
Aldwych
Charing Cross station  
Trafalgar Square

N205
Route N205 was introduced on 31 August 2013 when route 205 ceased to be a 24-hour route. It has been operated by East London since its inception.

Route N205 operates via these primary locations:
Route
Leyton
Stratford City bus station    
Mile End station 
Aldgate East station 
Liverpool Street station    
Old Street station  
King's Cross station  
Euston bus station   
Paddington station   
Paddington

N207
Route N207 commenced operation on 11 October 1996 between Uxbridge station and Victoria bus station. On 12 November 1999 it was diverted at Oxford Circus to Aldwych. On 28 April 2000 it was again rerouted to Holborn. Having been operated by First London since privatisation, it was included in the sale of Hayes garage to Metroline in June 2013. Upon being re-tendered, it passed to Abellio London on 6 April 2019.

Route N207 operates via these primary locations:
Route
Uxbridge station 
Hillingdon
Hayes End
Southall
Ealing Hospital
Hanwell
West Ealing
Ealing Broadway station   
Ealing Common station 
Acton
Shepherd's Bush Market station 
Shepherd's Bush station   
Holland Park station 
Notting Hill Gate station 
Marble Arch station 
Tottenham Court Road station  
Red Lion Square

N242
Route N242 commenced operating on 31 January 2003 between Homerton University Hospital and Tottenham Court Road station. It ceased on 23 April 2004 when route 242 was converted to a 24-hour service. It was reinstated on 15 June 2019 when route 242 ceased to be a 24-hour service.

Route N242 operates via these primary locations:
Route
Homerton University Hospital
Hackney Central station 
Shoreditch
Liverpool Street Station    
Bank station  
St Pauls station 
City Thameslink station 
Tottenham Court Road station

N253
Route N253 commenced operating on 3 September 1993 running between Aldgate bus station and Euston bus station. On 25 November 1994 it was extended to Trafalgar Square. On 29 May 1998, the route was withdrawn between Trafalgar Square and Tottenham Court Road station.

Route N253 operates via these primary locations:
Route
Aldgate bus station
Aldgate East station 
Whitechapel station  
Bethnal Green Tube station 
Cambridge Heath station 
Hackney Central station 
Hackney Downs station  
Clapton station 
Stamford Hill station 
Manor House station 
Finsbury Park station  
Holloway
Camden Road station 
Camden Town station 
Euston bus station   
Tottenham Court Road station

N271
Route N271 commenced operating on 4 February 2023 between North Finchley and Finsbury Square following the withdrawal of the daytime route 271.

Route N271 operates via these primary locations:
Route
North Finchley bus station
East Finchley station 
Highgate Village
Archway station 
Upper Holloway station 
Holloway Road station 
Highbury & Islington station   
Essex Road station 
Old Street station  
Moorgate Finsbury Square

N277
Route N277 commenced operating on 30 June 2018 between Crossharbour and Islington Angel.

Route N277 operates via these primary locations:
Route
Crossharbour
Mudchute station 
Canary Wharf station  
Mile End station 
Dalston Junction station  
Angel station 
Islington Angel

N279
Route N279 commenced operating on 26 April 1996 between Upshire and Victoria bus station. On 15 October 1999 it was withdrawn between Upshire and Waltham Cross. On 15 October 2004 it was cut back from Victoria to Trafalgar Square.

Route N279 operates via these primary locations:
Route
Waltham Cross station 
Edmonton Green station  
Bruce Grove station 
Seven Sisters station   
Finsbury Park station  
Camden Road station 
Camden Town station 
Tottenham Court Road station  
Trafalgar Square

N343
Route N343 commenced operating on 2 February 2001 between New Cross garage and Victoria bus station. Having been operated by London Central since its inception, about being re-tendered it was taken over by Travel London in 2006. It was included in the sale of Travel London to Abellio London in May 2009. Upon being re-tendered it returned to London Central on 13 February 2018.

Route N343 operates via these primary locations:
Route
New Cross Gate
Brockley
Peckham Rye station  
Elephant & Castle station  
Borough station 
London Bridge station  
Aldwych
Charing Cross station  
Trafalgar Square

N381
Route N381 commenced operating on 9 October 1999 between Peckham and Trafalgar Square. Initially operated by London Central, upon being re-tendered it was taken over by Connex on 9 October 2004. It was included in the sale of Connex to Travel London in February 2004 which in turn was sold to Abellio London in May 2009.

Route N381 operates via these primary locations:
Route
Peckham
Surrey Quays station 
Canada Water station  
Rotherhithe station 
Bermondsey station 
London Bridge station  
Southwark
Waterloo station  
Westminster station 
Horse Guards Parade

N550
Route N550 commenced on 30 October 2008 between Canning Town bus station and Trafalgar Square replacing route N50 between Canning Town and East Beckton. Initially operated by East London, upon being re-tendered it was taken over by Tower Transit on 31 August 2013. When next tendered it passed to CT Plus on 1 August 2018.

Route N550 operates via these primary locations:
Route
Canning Town bus station  
Leamouth
East India station 
Blackwall
Cubitt Town
Island Gardens station 
Millwall
Canary Wharf station 
Westferry station 
Limehouse station  
Aldgate East station 
Aldgate station 
Bank station  
Mansion House station 
Blackfriars station  
Embankment station 
Trafalgar Square

N551
Route N551 commenced on 30 October 2008 between Gallions Reach Shopping Park and Trafalgar Square. Initially operated by Docklands Buses, upon being re-tendered it was taken over by Tower Transit on 31 August 2013. When next tendered it passed to CT Plus on 1 August 2018.

Route N551 operates via these primary locations:
Route
Gallions Reach Shopping Park
Gallions Reach station 
Beckton bus station
Prince Regent station 
Custom House station 
Canning Town bus station  
Limehouse station  
Aldgate station 
Bank  
Mansion House station 
City Thameslink station 
Trafalgar Square

See also
Night Tube

References

Bus routes in London
London
Night bus service
Transport in the City of London
Transport in the City of Westminster
Transport in the London Borough of Barking and Dagenham
Transport in the London Borough of Barnet
Transport in the London Borough of Bexley
Transport in the London Borough of Brent
Transport in the London Borough of Bromley
Transport in the London Borough of Camden
Transport in the London Borough of Croydon
Transport in the London Borough of Ealing
Transport in the London Borough of Enfield
Transport in the London Borough of Hackney
Transport in the London Borough of Hammersmith and Fulham
Transport in the London Borough of Haringey
Transport in the London Borough of Harrow
Transport in the London Borough of Havering
Transport in the London Borough of Hillingdon
Transport in the London Borough of Hounslow
Transport in the London Borough of Lambeth
Transport in the London Borough of Lewisham
Transport in the London Borough of Merton
Transport in the London Borough of Newham
Transport in the London Borough of Redbridge
Transport in the London Borough of Richmond upon Thames
Transport in the London Borough of Southwark
Transport in the London Borough of Sutton
Transport in the London Borough of Tower Hamlets
Transport in the London Borough of Waltham Forest
Transport in the London Borough of Wandsworth
Transport in the Royal Borough of Greenwich
Transport in the Royal Borough of Kensington and Chelsea
Transport in the Royal Borough of Kingston upon Thames